Joshua Matthew Andrews (born 16 October 2001) is an English professional footballer who plays as a striker for Birmingham City of the . He made his Football League debut while on loan to Harrogate Town of League Two in 2021, and made two more loans to League Two clubs, Rochdale in 2021–22 and Doncaster Rovers in the first half of 2022–23.

Early and personal life
Andrews was born in Solihull, where he attended Greswolde Primary School and Langley School, and played football for Wychall Wanderers. He was a childhood fan of Birmingham City.

Career
He joined Birmingham City's academy in 2009, and took up a scholarship with the club in July 2018. According to his club profile at under-23 level, he "cites his finishing, hold-up play and runs in behind as his main attributes and is looking to make improvements in his heading."

Birmingham City made him an offer of professional terms in April 2020, and in July he signed a two-year contract with an option for a third year. In November, coach Steve Spooner highlighted his having "grown into his body", so that the  youth had become a large man with increasing ability to use his physicality, as well as "finding and working space for himself inside the box". He scored seven goals in four matches for Birmingham's under-23 team in October and November, including all four in a 5–4 loss to Ipswich Town U23 and winners against Swansea City U23 and Colchester United U23, and by the end of January 2021 had nine goals and four assists from eleven appearances.

Andrews signed for League Two club Harrogate Town on 1 February 2021 on loan for the remainder of the season. According to Harrogate manager Simon Weaver, "It's his first loan which means it's not about starting every game but adapting to the culture and learning. When Birmingham told me he's the type of lad that's willing to learn, it became a no-brainer for us." His Birmingham U23 team-mate Mitchell Roberts had made the same move a few weeks earlier. Andrews made his club and Football League debut on 6 February, as a very late substitute in a 3–1 win away to Crawley Town. He made an similarly brief appearance in the next match, returned to Birmingham for treatment to an injury, and was not used again until the final fixture of the season. He returned to help Birmingham's U23s win the overall Professional Development League title. According to the Birmingham Mail, his introduction at half-time was "a big reason for Blues' improved second half showing" in the semi-final against Bristol City U23, and he played the last quarter-hour of the final, in which Birmingham beat Sheffield United U23 2–0.

Andrews joined another League Two club, Rochdale, on 10 August 2021 on loan for the 2021–22 season. He made his debut a week later, replacing the injured Jake Beesley after 24 minutes of a 2–1 defeat at home to Forest Green Rovers. Andrews started the next match, away to previously unbeaten Northampton Town; after 73 minutes, he beat the offside trap to score his first senior goal and help his side secure their first win of the season. Injury again interrupted his progress: a hamstring problem kept him out for several weeks, but he returned to form, with four goals from twelve matches. According to Rochdale manager Robbie Stockdale, he was getting into good positions but needed to take his chances: "I think he himself would say he probably should be on five or six now – which would be a good return for the games he has been available for." After turning his ankle in January 2022, he returned to Birmingham for treatment. Having demonstrated his fitness with a "thunderbolt goal" for Birmingham's U23s, he made five brief substitute appearances for Rochdale over the last six weeks of the season to take his totals to five goals from 22 matches in all competitions.

In April 2022, Birmingham took up their option to extend Andrews' contract for a further year. In July, he joined another League Two club, Doncaster Rovers, on loan until January 2023. After five appearances without scoring, Andrews returned to Birmingham for treatment to tendonitis in his knee, and did not play for Doncaster again.

Career statistics

References

2001 births
Living people
Sportspeople from Solihull
English footballers
Association football forwards
Birmingham City F.C. players
Harrogate Town A.F.C. players
Rochdale A.F.C. players
Doncaster Rovers F.C. players
English Football League players